Walnut Creek Power is an American women's soccer team, founded in 2007. The team is a member of the Women's Premier Soccer League, the third tier of women's soccer in the United States and Canada. The team plays in the North Division of the Pacific Conference.

The team plays its home games in the stadium at Las Lomas High School in the city of Walnut Creek, California, 18 miles northeast of downtown Oakland. The team's colors are white, black and royal blue.

Prior to the 2008 season the team was known as Lamorinda East Bay Power.

Year-by-year

Honors

Competition History

Coaches
  Ernesto Silva 2005–present

Stadia
 Stadium at Las Lomas High School; Walnut Creek, California -present
 Stadium at Campolindo High School; Moraga, California 2008 (2 games)

Average Attendance

External links
 WPSL Walnut Creek Power page

Women's Premier Soccer League teams
Women's soccer clubs in California
2007 establishments in California
Association football clubs established in 2007